Sergio Antonio Bufarini (born 20 September 1963 in Buenos Aires, Argentina) is a former Argentine football (soccer) player, who  played forward.

External links
 

1963 births
Living people
Footballers from Buenos Aires
Argentine footballers
Argentine expatriate footballers
Club Atlético Independiente footballers
Club Atlético Platense footballers
Deportivo Armenio footballers
Instituto footballers
Talleres de Córdoba footballers
C.D. Huachipato footballers
Comunicaciones F.C. players
Alianza F.C. footballers
Expatriate footballers in Chile
Expatriate footballers in Peru
Expatriate footballers in Guatemala
Expatriate footballers in El Salvador
Association football midfielders